Eduardo Lima can refer to:

 Eduardo Lima (Brazilian footballer)
 Eduardo Lima (Venezuelan footballer)